René Félix Louis Joseph Riffaud (December 19, 1898 – January 16, 2007) was one of the last four 'official' French veterans of the First World War when he died at age 108 in Tosny, France.

Born in Jendouba, Tunisia, Riffaud was conscripted into the Army of Africa in April 1917 as a 2nd class soldier (Soldat de deuxième classe) and served in various regiments. He was discharged in 1919 after a bout of tuberculosis, but rejoined later that year, and served until 1924.

His wife, Lucie, whom he married in 1930, died in 1979. Their only son also pre-deceased him.

Decorations

 Chevalier of the Legion of Honour
 Croix de Guerre 1914-1918
 Combatant's Cross
 1914–1918 Commemorative war medal
 Medal of French Gratitude
 World War I Victory Medal

See also
 Tirailleurs

References

 

1898 births
2007 deaths
French centenarians
Men centenarians
French military personnel of World War I
People from Jendouba Governorate
Chevaliers of the Légion d'honneur
Recipients of the Croix de Guerre 1914–1918 (France)
Pieds-Noirs